ŽORK Napredak is a women's handball club from Kruševac, Serbia.

History
ŽORK Napredak was founded on 1 September 1952. No precise data about the place and date of playing the first game, but the memory of the oldest, it was 14 October 1952, on the occasion of the commemoration of the liberation from Axis of the city of Kruševac. It was a students team competition in Kruševac. The period between 1952 and 1971 was marked by the school competition.

In 1971 ŽORK Napredak enters the official competition organized by the Handball Association of Yugoslavia and then in the next two decades it became a strong club, worthy of respect in the Socialist Federal Republic of Yugoslavia. The most important trophy ŽORK Napredak won in this period was the trophy SFR Yugoslavia in 1989.

In the early nineties ŽORK Napredak grew into a leading Yugoslav and European clubs, and reached its peak in last years of the twentieth century. In the period between 1995 and 2000 ŽORK Napredak won the most of their trophies. Including EHF Challenge Cup 1999 and Yugoslav Cup also in 1999.

Honours

European

EHF Challenge Cup:
Winners (1): 1999
Cup Winners' Cup:
1/4 finals (2): 1998, 2001

National

National cup:
Winners (1) 1999
National league:
Vice-champions (5) 1997-2001

Notable former players

 Ljiljana Knežević
 Tanja Milanović
 Zlata Paplacko
 Danijela Erčević
 Ana Batinić
 Ana Đokić
 Ana Vojčić
 Andrijana Budimir
 Slađana Dronić

External links
Official website : http://www.zork-napredak.rs/

Facebook page : https://www.facebook.com/zorknapredak
 http://www.eurohandball.com/ec/chc/women/2007-08/clubs/003734/ZORK+Napredak+Krusevac
 http://www.srbijasport.net/klub/416
 http://rss.org.rs/#licence:177
 http://rss.org.rs/

Serbian handball clubs
Sport in Kruševac